Find Me In These Fields is the title of a 1990 album by guitarist Phil Keaggy, released on A&M Records.

Track listing
All songs are by Phil Keaggy, unless otherwise noted.

 "untitled"  – 0:19 (Acoustic instrumental, recorded live direct to disk)
 "Strong Tower"  – 4:14
 "Carry On"  – 3:14
 "untitled"  – 0:39 (Acoustic instrumental, recorded live direct to disk)
 "When the Wild Winds Blow"  – 5:39
 "This Side of Heaven"  – 4:18
 "Find Me in These Fields"  – 3:56
 "Get over It"  – 6:08
 "Calling You"  – 4:17
 "untitled"  – 2:32 (Electric instrumental, recorded live direct to disk)
 "Gentle and Strong"  – 3:37
 "Final Day"  – 3:57
 "untitled"  – 2:08 (Electric instrumental, recorded live direct to disk)
 "Be in My Heart" (John Perry)  – 4:40
 "untitled"  – 1:00 (Electric instrumental, recorded live direct to disk)

Personnel 

 Phil Keaggy – guitars, vocals (2, 3, 5–9, 11, 12, 14)
 Phil Madeira – acoustic piano and Hammond B3 organ (2, 3, 5–9, 11, 12, 14), backing vocals (12, 14)
 Rick Cua – bass (2, 3, 5–9, 11, 12, 14)
 Mike Mead – drums and percussion (2, 3, 5–9, 11, 12, 14)
 John Catchings – cello (7)
 Sam Bush – fiddle (11)
 David Mullen – backing vocals (2), additional backing vocals (5)
 Radney Foster – backing vocals (5)
 Bill Lloyd – backing vocals (5)
 Lynn Nichols – additional backing vocals (5), backing vocals (11, 12, 14)
 Steve Taylor – backing vocals (11)
 Charlie Peacock – backing vocals (14)
 Elinor Madeira – backing vocals (14)
 Kathy, Bianca, and Damann Nichols – backing vocals (14)
 Bernadette, Alicia, Olivia, and Ian Keaggy – backing vocals (14)

Production
 L. Arthur Nichols – producer
 Phil Keaggy – producer
 JB – engineer at The Bennett House, Franklin, Tennessee, mixing 
 Ben Pearson – photography

References 

1990 albums
Phil Keaggy albums